The 1962 California gubernatorial election was held on November 6, 1962. The Democratic incumbent, Pat Brown, ran for re-election against former U.S. vice president and 1960 Republican presidential nominee Richard Nixon. In his concession speech the following morning, Nixon accused the media of favoring his opponent Brown, stating that it was his "last press conference" and "You won't have Nixon to kick around any more." Six years later, Nixon was elected President of the United States, and ten years later to the day, he was re-elected in a landslide.

Background
Pat Brown was a relatively popular Democratic governor in California who was first elected in 1958. However, he was seen as vulnerable due to criticisms of indecision and occasional errors in policy.

In 1958, the Democratic Party had swept all but a single statewide office, and all of the incumbents were seeking reelection in 1962. Despite 1958's near-sweep by Democrats and the state having more registered Democrats than Republicans (4,289,997 registered Democrats on election day 1962 compared to 3,002,038 registered Republicans), at the time, California was generally considered a Republican stronghold, with Republican governors and senators from the end of World War II until the election of Democrat Clair Engle to the Senate in 1958, and Brown's election as governor the same year. The state had voted for Eisenhower in 1952 and 1956, and Nixon carried the state over John F. Kennedy in the 1960 Presidential election.

In 1962, with popular incumbent Senator Thomas Kuchel essentially guaranteed to win re-election, the Republican Party felt it could also gain the governorship and win the state back from the Democrats. They turned to former Vice President Richard Nixon, the biggest name at the time in the California Republican Party. Nixon had a record of winning statewide elections in California, having been elected Senator in 1950, carrying the state twice (in 1952 and 1956) as the vice presidential candidate on the ticket with Dwight D. Eisenhower, and carrying the state against Kennedy in the 1960 presidential election. They also felt a convincing win could be a springboard for Nixon to challenge Kennedy again in 1964, since he narrowly lost to him in 1960.

Democratic primary

Candidates
Pat Brown, incumbent governor since 1959

Campaign
Brown, a relatively popular incumbent, faced no serious opposition in the Democratic Party primary. In whole, the Democratic primaries for statewide offices showed a lack of strong division in the party, with the exception of William McKesson's unsuccessful challenge to incumbent Glenn M. Anderson in the race for the Democratic nomination for lieutenant governor. 

Brown was endorsed by the liberal California Democratic Council, which put him on their slate of endorsed candidates at their convention, held January 26–28, 1962 in Fresno. Brown's camp made an effort of enduring that none of the resolutions the council passed at their convention would provide fodder that a Republican general election opponent could use to embarrass Brown.

Brown's camp emphasized accomplishments of Brown's legislative record, including programs related to water and education. Public relations consultants played a role in reshaping Brown's image as a forceful and decisive leader.

The primary elections were held on June 5, 1962.

Republican primary

Candidates
Richard Nixon, former U.S. senator (1950–1953), U.S. vice president (1953–1961), and Republican nominee for president of the United States in 1960
Joseph C. Shell, California State Assembly minority leader

Withdrew
Goodwin Knight, former governor of California (withdrew January 16, 1962)
Harold J. Powers, former lieutenant governor of California (withdrew March 1962)

Campaign
Nixon announced his candidacy for governor on September 27, 1961, roughly seven months after losing the 1960 presidential election. His bid was largely seen as a step towards either a 1964 or 1968 presidential campaign. Nixon's 1962 campaign was managed by H. R. Haldeman.

On January 16, 1962, former governor Goodie Knight was forced to withdraw his campaign for the nomination after suffering a serious case of hepatitis. Knight had been a popular governor, and his withdrawal was beneficial to Nixon's prospects of capturing the nomination. In the first week of March 1962, former lieutenant governor Harold J. Powers withdrew from the primary, due to lack of organizational and financial campaign for his candidacy. This left Nixon facing only the conservative California State Assembly minority leader  Joseph C. Shell in the primary. Shell was a wealthy man, having earned his fortune in oil, and was seen as a militant leader of conservative faction of the Republican Party. Shell received support from the John Birch Society, who he had advocated welcoming within the party. 

Democrats took a hands-off approach to dealing with the Republican primary, letting Nixon and Shell duke it out between themselves without Democratic engagement. Nixon had wanted to hold a series of debates with Brown during the primary campaign season, but Brown did not engage in such debates with Nixon.

Shell hoped to win the support of conservative Republicans, and hoped that there would be lower Republican primary turnout that would lead to the participating electorate having a significantly conservative lean. In announcing his candidacy, Shell had claimed to be seeking the support of voters that supported, 

In terms of party leadership support, Nixon had far more support from the California Republican Party's state central executive committee than Shell did. However, a fight emerged between Nixon and Shell backers in gaining organizational power at the county and precinct level organizations of the party.

Nixon, on February 17, 1962 declared that he would not seek the endorsement of the California Republican Assembly (CRA). This was possibly due to the fact that he had previously, in his 1950 U.S. Senate primary, lost the endorsement of a subcommittee of the organization, and he perhaps was reluctant to seek support from the organization again. On February 17, 1962, Nixon declared that he would not, himself, provide backing to any candidate involved with the John Birch Society, remarking that he had, "no commitment to endorse any candidate who seeks or accepts the support of the John Birch Society, even if they were the Republican Party nominees. Nixon quickly recanted his decision not to seek the endorsement of the CRA, and decided to indicate that he would seek their nomination and would additionally propose a resolution at their convention which would renounce the John Birch Society.

Nixon beat Shell for support of the subcommittee of the CRA's fact-finding committee by a 7–5 vote. He again beat Shell for the support of the full fact-finding committee's support in a 34–25 vote. In the floor vote of the CRA convention, Nixon beat Shell for the CRA's endorsement in a 263–176 vote. Additionally, at the convention, Nixon saw a supporter of his, former Kansas governor Fred Hall, elected as the CRA's president. At the convention, Nixon sponsored a resolution to repudiate the John Birch Society's president Robert W. Welch Jr. and urging members of the CRA to abandon the John Birch Society if they were members of it. A contentious floor fight took place over the proposed resolution, with conservatives opposing it. A compromise was reached to adopt the portion condemning Welch but to not adopt the portion urging CRA members to abandon membership in the John Birch Society. Any association with the John Birch Society seemed politically unhelpful to Nixon in a general election, so this resolution was seen by him and his campaign as helping set him up for greater chances of victory in a general election.

Shell traveled extensively during his campaign by utilizing his own private plane. His campaign had decent financing and was effectively organized. A key argument he made in support of his candidacy was that the state's economy was threatened due, assailing spending by the Brown gubernatorial administration. He also attacked Brown's governance by alleging increased federal government influence over the state. Another key argument he made in support of his candidacy was that Nixon would be unable to beat Brown in a general election, arguing that Democratic-leaning voters would "solidify" against Nixon. Shell also levied accusations that either Nixon or supporters of Nixon's had resorted to "gutter tactics" by "whispering lies" about Shell's family. Shell also called into question Nixon's expertise on state government and challenged Nixon to televised debates.

Nixon campaigned across the state, often addressing sizable and curious crowds. Nixon ignored attacks from Shell in hopes not to ward off conservative support in the general election. Nixon's speeches dealt with subjects such as states' rights, reforms to taxes and budgets, addressing crime, and government efficiency. This was the first campaign in which Nixon had run for state office, and, therefore, the first time that he campaigned on state issues. Furthermore, a number of embarrassing political slip-ups that made him appear under-prepared, such as referring to the California State Capitol as the "state house". It was also used against Nixon that he was made to admit that he had made a factual error in his book Six Crises regarding its account of the case of Alger Hiss.

Results
Although Nixon beat Shell in the primary, 1,285,151 votes (65.4 percent) to Shell's 656,542 (33.4 percent), the contest was bitter, and Nixon did not reach out to conservative Shell supporters, which weakened him in the general election.

General election

Campaign
In a bitter and expensive campaign, Brown and Nixon campaigned with great zeal and effort. During the campaign, Nixon accused Brown of being weak on communism and crime. Brown alleged that Nixon was only interested in holding the governorship in order to utilize it as a steppingstone to the presidency.

Nixon had a lead in the polls early on, but Brown lessened the margin as time went on, and pre-election polls showed Brown winning.

Two weeks after the Republican primary, Shell endorsed Nixon's candidacy. Shell had conditioned an endorsement of Nixon on Nixon agreeing to make $200 million in cuts to the state budget and giving conservatives a share of the California delegates to the 1964 Republican National Convention.

Harold J. Powers, who had dropped out of the Republican primary, endorsed Brown in the general election.

Results

Brown not only won, but he won by a surprising 5%. A stunned and frustrated Nixon announced he was retiring from politics ("You won't have Nixon to kick around anymore"), a promise he would later rescind after running for president again in 1968; he won that election, and was later re-elected, but he resigned in disgrace in 1974 due to the Watergate scandal.

Brown was the first Democratic Party governor reelected in California since 1853, and only the third governor of any party reelected since California extended gubernatorial terms to four-years in 1862 (after only Hiram Johnson and Earl Warren). In the coinciding California State Legislature elections, the Democratic Party retained control of the State Legislature, marking the first time in the 20th century that the Democratic Party would hold control of the state's legislature for longer than a four-year period. The party won 53.9% of the cumulative popular vote in the State Legislature elections. In the coinciding United States House of Representatives elections in the state, Democrats gained nine seats, while Republicans lost one (the state had gained eight new seats in reapportionment after the 1960 United States census), and won 51.8% of the state's cumulative votes in its congressional races. All of the state's incumbent congressmen sought reelection, with three Republican incumbents and one Democratic incumbent losing reelection. The Democrats won seven of the eight newly-created congressional seats, while Republicans won one. Republican Senator Thomas Kuchel won reelection as expected in the coinciding United States Senate election, capturing an overwhelming share of the vote in that election.

Results by county
Brown is the last Democratic gubernatorial nominee to have won Colusa and Modoc Counties.

References

Further reading 
 Ambrose, Stephen E. Nixon Volume II: The Triumph of a Politician 1962-1972 (1989).
 Anderson, Totton J., and Eugene C. Lee. “The 1962 Election in California.” Western Political Quarterly, 16#2 (1963), pp. 396–420. online
 Anderson, Totton J. "Extremism in California Politics: The Brown-Knowland and Brown-Nixon Campaigns Compared." Political Research Quarterly 16.2 (1963): 371.
 Pawel, Miriam. (2018). The Browns of California : the family dynasty that transformed a state and shaped a nation. New York: Bloomsbury Publishing.
 Rapoport, R. California Dreaming: The Political Odyssey of Pat & Jerry Brown. Berkeley: Nolo Press (1982) .
  summary
 Rarick, Ethan. "The Brown Dynasty." in Modern American Political Dynasties: A Study of Power, Family, and Political Influence ed by Kathleen Gronnerud and Scott J. Spitzer. (2018): 211-30.
 Rice, Richard B. (2012). The Elusive Eden: A New History of California. New York: McGraw-Hill. .
 Rogin, Michael Paul, John L. Shover. Political Change in California: Critical Elections and Social Movements, 1890-1966 (Greenwood, 1970).
 Schuparra, Kurt. Triumph of the Right: The Rise of the California Conservative Movement, 1945-1966 (M.E. Sharpe, 1998).

External links
 California Elections Page
 U.S. Elections Atlas
 Our Campaigns

Gubernatorial
California
1962
Richard Nixon
November 1962 events in the United States